Henry Sage may refer to:

Henry M. Sage (1868–1933), New York state senator
Henry W. Sage (1814–1897), American philanthropist, chairman of the board of trustees of Cornell University

See also
Henry M. Sage Estate, in Menands, New York
Sage (name), disambiguation page